Orthocomotis altivolans is a species of moth of the family Tortricidae. It is found in Costa Rica.

Description 
The length of the forewings 12-13.5 mm. The ground colour of the forewings is copper to cinnamon, divided by white fascia with yellow gold to pale green gold overscaling. The hindwings are whitish with pale grey overscaling.

Etymology
The species name refers to the high elevation of the collecting sites.

References

Moths described in 2003
Orthocomotis